Lee Eun-gyeong (born 8 May 1997) is a South Korean archer. She competed at the 2018 Asian Games in Jakarta, where she won a gold medal with the South Korean archery team. She also won the 2018 Archery World Cup final.

She was the bronze medalist in 2014 Summer Youth Olympics archery women's event.

References 

1997 births
Living people
South Korean female archers
Archers at the 2014 Summer Youth Olympics
Universiade medalists in archery
Asian Games medalists in archery
Archers at the 2018 Asian Games
World Archery Championships medalists
Asian Games gold medalists for South Korea
Medalists at the 2018 Asian Games
Universiade gold medalists for South Korea
Medalists at the 2017 Summer Universiade
21st-century South Korean women